Winter Island (also known as Ruckels Island) is a  island in Suisun Bay, in the western Sacramento-San Joaquin River Delta. It is north of Pittsburg, separated from Browns Island to the west by a slough. It was private property, and contained one house. It is used as a duck hunting area, a wetland, and a dredging disposal area. In 2016 Winter Island was purchased by the California Department of Water Resources in order to restore the island as a tidal marsh. Winter Island is part of Contra Costa County, and managed by Reclamation District 2122. It is shown, labeled "Ruckels Island", on an 1850 survey map of the San Francisco Bay area made by Cadwalader Ringgold and an 1854 map of the area by Henry Lange.

In 2009, Brusco Tug and Barge, a tugboat company, pled guilty to illegal dredge dumping near the island between 2003 and 2007. In 2014, a large wildfire broke out on the island.

See also
List of islands of California
Baldwin Deepwater Shipping Channel
Stockton Deepwater Shipping Channel
Sacramento Deep Water Ship Channel

References

Islands of the Sacramento–San Joaquin River Delta
Islands of Northern California
Islands of Suisun Bay
Islands of Contra Costa County, California
Wetlands of the San Francisco Bay Area
Landforms of Contra Costa County, California
Pittsburg, California